Sara Jean Underwood (born March 26, 1984) is an American model, television host, and actress who was chosen as the Playmate of the Month for the July 2006 issue of Playboy magazine and later became Playmate of the Year in 2007. She is a former host of Attack of the Show! on G4.

Early life
Underwood was born in Portland, Oregon. She graduated from Scappoose High School in Scappoose, Oregon, in 2002. She has been a student at Oregon State University and Portland State University.

Underwood was a schoolmate of American football player Derek Anderson. Her first job was assisting in sales of heavy construction equipment. She worked in the Beaverton, Oregon, branch of the Hooters chain of restaurants.

Career

Modeling

Underwood first appeared in Playboy in its Girls of the Pac-10 pictorial in the October 2005 issue. She was featured on the cover, holding a football and clad only in a body painted rendering of an Oregon State Beavers football jersey and matching bikini briefs. She next appeared in the magazine in July 2006, as the Playmate of the Month. When she became Playmate of the Year in June 2007, her prize included a Mini Cooper convertible. She was the first Miss July to receive the title, although she herself said, "I didn't think I was pretty enough". In March 2008, Playboy magazine ranked her at #25 on their "25 Hottest Playboy Celebrities" list.

Underwood appeared in episode #2 of the E! network's series The Girls Next Door, as a Playmate hoping to have her test shoot taken at Playboy Studio West. Subsequently, Playboy featured her as Miss July 2006. She appeared in several more episodes of The Girls Next Door.

On June 7, 2007, a group of Oregon State University women's studies students created a poster celebrating Underwood's selection as Playboy 2007 Playmate of the Year, and posted it outside Bexel Hall, where it remained in place for only a few hours before Oregon State University staff took it down. The poster embraced the theme and the style of the "Achievement" posters that line Campus Way at the university. The poster read, "Sara Jean: First OSU Beaver Playmate of the Year, Playboy June '07, OSU Centerfold, People, Ideas, Innovation." The mention of her as the "first" Playmate of the Year from OSU was actually incorrect; she was preceded by Jodi Ann Paterson, the Playmate of the Year for 2000.

Underwood is credited with discovering 2009 Playmate of the Year Ida Ljungqvist while shopping on Rodeo Drive in Beverly Hills, California.

Film and television work
 

Underwood appears as a pirate wench in the 2007 film Epic Movie, along with fellow Playmates Qiana Chase, Irina Voronina and Jillian Grace. Underwood appeared as a playmate in the 2008 comedy, House Bunny, along with fellow playmates and in 2009 was in the film The Telling with Bridget Marquardt and Holly Madison, and as herself in Miss March. In 2013 Underwood was cast in the lead role in the horror thriller Deadly Weekend (also known as Zellwood).

Underwood appeared on the wedding episode of Kendra where it was announced at Kendra Wilkinson's bachelorette party that Underwood had undergone breast augmentation surgery. Later, on The Howard Stern Show, Underwood confirmed that she had breast implants.

Underwood has also worked in television as a presenter. She worked as a "fight jock" or continuity announcer for the Blackbelt TV cable network. In 2009 she co-hosted five episodes of G4's Attack of the Show, filling in for a vacationing Olivia Munn. She co-hosted episodes in 2010. In 2011, she was a substitute host and one of the regular presenters of The Feed.

An avid practitioner of yoga, Underwood competed in the eighth Kunoichi competition in Japan, known in the U.S. as Women of Ninja Warrior. She won her first stage heat after gaining a big lead on three Japanese contestants that had more pedigreed backgrounds in athletics. She failed on the second stage when she misjudged the second step of the Dancing Stones and fell.

After modeling in advertising for VictoryPoker.net and playing in charity poker tournaments, Underwood joined their team of professional poker players.

In 2012 Underwood was on MTV's reality show Ridiculousness as a guest star for Season 2.

Personal life 
Underwood had a two-year on-off relationship with television presenter Ryan Seacrest. In 2013 she dated The Bachelorette season 6's Roberto Martinez.

Sara met her partner Jacob Witzling when she inquired about doing a photoshoot with some of the whimsical cabins he built. From February 13, 2019 to May 15, 2020 they produced a YouTube channel to document the build process of several cabins.

Filmography

Film

Television 
 Attack of the Show! co-host, 147 episodes.
 Kunoichi (Women of Ninja Warrior), Competitor, Competition 8, Exited at round 2.
 Bridget's Sexiest Beaches Guest, Season 1 Episode 2, "Croatia".
 Ridiculousness Guest
 ''Web Soup 2009 Golden Awards Guest

References

External links 

 
 

1984 births
21st-century American actresses
Actresses from Portland, Oregon
American film actresses
American television personalities
American women television personalities
Glamour models
Living people
Oregon State University alumni
People from Columbia County, Oregon
2000s Playboy Playmates
Playboy Playmates of the Year
Portland State University alumni